Monmouth Town Council is the town council of the traditional county town of Monmouth, south-east Wales. The Council comprises 16 members, who are elected every five years.  The Mayor is the titular head of the council. The council has its offices in the Shire Hall, a Grade I listed building owned by Monmouthshire County Council.

Monmouth is located within the principal area of Monmouthshire, one of the 22 unitary authorities of Wales.

Responsibilities
The Town Council is responsible for a limited range of local government functions, including street cleaning, children's play areas, the town's Christmas lights and floral displays, civic events, and grants to local organisations, and is consulted by the County Council on other matters including planning applications.  It operates a community projects grants scheme.

History
During the reign of William the Conqueror, a castle was built in Monmouth to control the area and its resources. In addition to the castle and Benedictine priory, the town also had burgesses in medieval times. Burgesses had an exclusive control over trade in the market. This monopoly created the need for a local government organisation, which evolved into Monmouth's town council when in 1447 Henry VI granted a charter providing for sixteen councillors, from whom one was elected as mayor, plus the right to two maces, which remains in practice to this day.

Shire Hall

Shire Hall is the meeting place of the council. Located in the town centre, Shire Hall is a Grade I listed building. It was built in 1724, and was formerly the centre for the Assize Courts and Quarter Sessions for Monmouthshire. It is owned by Monmouthshire County Council, and beside serving as town hall of Monmouth, it is also used as the town's Tourist Information Centre.

Mayor

The Mayor of Monmouth is the titular head of the council. Incumbent mayor is Alice Fletcher, who was elected in the annual general meeting of the council on 13 June 2022. The position of Deputy Mayor is held by Tom Kirton.

Council members
Monmouth has five wards: Town, Dixton with Osbaston, Drybridge, Overmonnow, and Wyesham. Four county councillors are elected from these wards for Monmouthshire County Council. In the Town Council there are 16 members, who are elected every four years. Each ward has four members in the council, except Drybridge, which has three representatives, and Town ward with one representative.

At the May 2017 elections, seven Indy Monmouth councillors won seats on the town council. One of them, Cllr Anna Antebi, resigned from her Town ward seat in September 2017 for personal reasons. Conservative, Rob Caffel, won the seat by two votes at a by-election in November.

References

1. http://www.monmouth.gov.uk/the-town-council/ retrieved 30 July 2018

External links

Local government in Monmouthshire
Monmouth, Wales
Community councils of Wales